Fléchin is a commune in the Pas-de-Calais department in the Hauts-de-France region of France.

Geography
A farming village situated 13 miles (21 km) south of Saint-Omer, at the D95E1 and D77 road junction.

Surrounded by the communes Febvin-Palfart, Enquin-les-Mines and Laires, Fléchin is located 20 km northwest of Bruay-la-Buissière, the largest city around.

Population

Places of interest
 The church of St.Martin, dating from the twelfth century.
 The church of St.Peter, dating from the fifteenth century.
 The church of St.Jacques, in the hamlet of Cuhem, dating from the nineteenth century.
 Two watermills.

Notable people
Charles Jonnart (1857–1927), French politician, was born here.

See also
Communes of the Pas-de-Calais department

References

Communes of Pas-de-Calais